The Romanian: Story of an Obsession is a true-to-life memoir by Bruce Benderson. The autobiographical text describes Benderson's encounters and journeys with a male Romanian street hustler through Romania and Hungary, whom he meets while on a journalism assignment and falls in love with. The plot is intertwined with a travelogue of Romania and references to Romanian history and culture, such as the life of the artist Constantin Brâncuși, the writer Panait Istrati and the love affair between Romania's interbellum king, Carol II, and his mistress, Magda Lupescu.

The book was first published in French, in 2004, under the title Autobiographie érotique (Erotic autobiography). It won the prestigious Prix de Flore award in 2004, thus making Benderson the first US author to win the prize. In 2006, it was published in English, released in the United States and the United Kingdom.

External links
Review of the memoir at Village Voice
Review of the memoir in  Los Angeles Times

2004 American novels
American LGBT novels
American autobiographical novels
Novels with gay themes
Novels set in Romania
Novels set in Hungary
2000s LGBT novels
2004 LGBT-related literary works